Giacomo Chiazzolino (born 25 May 1986) is an Italian professional footballer who plays for Alpignano Calcio.

Biography
On 17 June 2008 Chiazzolino was signed by Parma for €100,000 in 5-year contract. During 2007–08 season Parma also signed 50% registration rights of Massimo Volta from Carpenedolo. Chiazzolino spent entire Parma career in temporary deals to other clubs. In 2011 Chiazzolino was signed by Valenzana in another temporary deal. On 18 July 2012 Chiazzolino left for Castiglione.

On 3 January 2014 Chiazzolino left for Bra. Both clubs relegated to Serie D at the end of season.

On 20 August 2019, Chiazzolino signed for Alpignano Calcio.

References

External links
 AIC profile (data by football.it) 
 

Italian footballers
Juventus F.C. players
F.C.D. Lottogiaveno players
A.C. Carpenedolo players
Parma Calcio 1913 players
A.C. Legnano players
U.S. Alessandria Calcio 1912 players
Valenzana Mado players
A.C. Bra players
Serie C players
Serie D players
Association football midfielders
Footballers from Turin
1986 births
Living people